Cham Gulak (also Romanized as Cham Gulak, Cham Gulak, Cham Gulak; also known as Cham Gulak) is a city in Howmeh Rural District, in the Central District of andimeshk County, Khuzestan Province, Iran. As of the 2016 census, its population was 5,446, with there being 1,468  families.

References 

Populated places in Andimeshk County
Cities in Khuzestan Province